Kamienny Most may refer to the following places in Poland:

Kamienny Most, Łódź Voivodeship
Kamienny Most, West Pomeranian Voivodeship

See also
Kamienny